Robert Hecht is the name of:

 Robert E. Hecht (1919–2012), American antiquities dealer
 Robert Hecht-Nielsen (born 1947), adjunct professor of electrical and computer engineering at the University of California, San Diego
 Robert M. Hecht (born 1953), American global health policy and financing expert